Rescue is a multidirectional shooter arcade video game in which the player navigates a helicopter over the open seas to rescue stranded paratroopers from enemy forces and sharks. It was designed by Chris Oberth  and released by Stern, as an upright arcade machine, in 1982. Rescue combines the dual-stick controls of Robotron: 2084 and the core pick-up/drop-off gameplay of Choplifter.

Gameplay
The game uses one joystick for movement and one for firing as well as an additional "sub-bomb" button.

Reception
Electronic Games reviewed Rescue in 1982. The reviewer comments: "With Rescue, everything ties together in a neat package that's not only fun to play, but increasingly challenging the further you're able to go into the mission."

References

1982 video games
Arcade video games
Arcade-only video games
Helicopter video games
Stern video games
Twin-stick shooters
Video games developed in the United States